Funny Times is the debut comedy studio album released by British comedian Harry Hill. The album was released on 29 November 2010. The album was originally due to be entitled Sergeant Peppers II, but due to copyright issues, it was later retitled to Funny Times. The album is perhaps best known for featuring the song "Ken!", a song about Ken Barlow, a character on television soap Coronation Street played by William Roache.

Critical reception
Adam Kennedy of the BBC wrote: "As a television personality, Harry Hill is a rare breed, entertaining the masses with unrestrained wackiness while sneaking more mischievous references below early evening watershed radars. His debut full-length musical foray pulls a comparable trick, obscuring occasionally caustic wit beneath surface silliness. Despite distancing Funny Times from his best-known Technicolor vehicle TV Burp, Hill himself admits the album envelops similar themes. That’s inevitable, given the former doctor’s devotion to dissecting the slowly decaying corpse of popular culture-slash-television. But certain targets warrant further ridicule beyond 30-second TV gags, selected here with deadly accuracy. The Disappointment Song demonstrates that knack pithily, ripping into Sarah Jessica Parker and co’s big screen excursions with barely-concealed zeal. Nobody is safe, either, from gardeners-turned-tedious chatshow hosts to family members."

"Expectedly random guests – ABC’s Martin Fry, William ‘Ken Barlow’ Roache, Bruce Forsyth – garnish moments between Hill's politely narked highs. And trusty newsreader John Craven announces the genuine peak: Never Be Holly Willoughby Symphony is a geeky timewaster's letter to the eponymous presenter, offering to take her out to a ludicrous array of family-friendly UK attractions. Essentially Eminem's Stan lectured in British etiquette, it pauses only to insult her "tiny" husband. Hill's eye for the ridiculous is tempered by completing rhymes that many musical comedians would only dare allude to. Nothing is left to the imagination in Phone Up Yer Mum certainly, Hill advising us "Be a good son and phone up yer mum, ‘Cos one day she’ll be dead", before trading off subtle nuances of such conversations with commendable attention to detail. Repeated spins will, naturally, send you barmier than Hill, particularly closing Brucie ballad I'm Not Anyone and flagship scally-dissing number I Wanna Baby. As a one-off trip through a madcap brain, however, Funny Times splits a few sides and then some."

Singles
 "I Wanna Baby" was released as the first single from the album on 18 October 2010. The video for the track premiered on the date of release, at a total length of three minutes and thirty seconds. It features Hill performing as Chantelle, the person whom the song centres around. Chantelle also appears in the video, played by an uncredited actress. The majority of the video is set on the exterior of a high-rise council estate. On 27 October, a behind-the-scenes look at the video was uploaded to YouTube. The track did not chart.
 "SuBo" was released as the second single from the album on 15 November 2010, exclusively via the Tesco Entertainment online store. Available exclusively as a download, the single contained a demo version of "Safe As Sheep" as the B-side. No official music video was released for the track, however, the official audio video was uploaded to YouTube on 3 November 2010.
 "Ken!" was released as the third and final official single from the album on 13 December 2010. The music video for the track premiered on 10 December, as part of Coronation Street: The Big 50, a special programme celebrating the show's 50th anniversary. The video features Hill and Ken performing the song in a western bar, in and around a group of cowboys.

Music videos
 An animated music video for the album track "Nuggets Nocturne" was released on 4 November 2010. Filmed and animated by Ruth Barrett, the three-minute video has so far racked up more than 11,000 views, and has received acclaim from fans and critics alike, for the acclaimed style of animation.
 A music video for the album track "Flatscreen TV" was released on 9 November 2010. The video features Hill portraying a number of television characters on his fingers, such as the stars of Coronation Street, Emmerdale, The Bill, EastEnders, You've Been Framed! and Harry Hill's TV Burp.

Track listing
 The album's track listing was confirmed by HMV on 14 November 2010. All tracks written, composed, produced and performed by Harry Hill.

 "Happy Giftmas" (Intro) - 1:05
 "I Wanna Baby" - 3:21
 "Big Mag" (Interlude) - 0:53
 "Ken!" (featuring William Roache aka Ken Barlow) - 3:29
 "Phone Up Yer Mum" - 3:56
 "Nuggets Nocturne" - 2:51
 "Never Be Holly Willoughby Symphony" (featuring John Craven) - 4:11
 "Subo" - 3:08
 "Safe As Sheep" - 4:10
 "This Guy's in Love With You" (featuring Martin Fry) - 4:35
 "The Disappointment Song (Sex and The City)" - 2:55
 "Alan Titchmarsh Song" (Interlude) - 1:11
 "I Wish My Brother in Law's Voice Didn't Go Up at the End of Every Sentence" - 3:29
 "Flat Screen TV" - 3:32
 "I'm Not Anyone" (featuring Bruce Forsyth) - 4:57

Harry Hill.com Digital Bonus Content
 Physical copies of the album contained an exclusive code, which when entered into Harry's official website, unlocks a further fourteen tracks to download for free.

 "True" (featuring Martin Kemp) - 3:02
 "Britishness Tests" - 4:18
 "O.A.P. Idol (Part 1)" - 1:54
 "(You're Love Keeps Liftin' Me) Higher and Higher" - 2:54
 "Sunday Morning" (featuring Jan Leeming) - 3:48
 "Winter Olympics Come To London" - 2:29
 "O.A.P. Idol (Part 2)" - 2:32
 "I Want to Break Free" - 3:25
 "Interview with Ken Livingstone" (featuring Ken Livingstone) - 5:03
 "Don't Go Changing" - 3:05
 "Robbie Williams' Wives" - 3:40
 "Born To Run" - 3:19
 "O.A.P. Idol (Part 3)" - 2:18
 "The Queen is Pregnant Song" - 3:39

iTunes Store Digital Bonus Content
 Copies bought from the iTunes Store feature a number of bonus music videos and featurettes, aside from the main album.

 "Ken" - Video
 "Nuggets Nocturne" - Video
 "I Wanna Baby" - Video
 "Flatscreen TV" - Video
 "I Wanna Baby" - Behind The Scenes
 "Harry on Benny Hill"
 "Harry on Bruce Forsyth"
 "SuBo" - Lyric Video
 "Funny Times" - TV Advert

References

2010 debut albums
Harry Hill albums
Island Records albums